Frederick Charles Adam Mansfield (9 March 1915 – 1 January 1992) was an English professional footballer who played as a right back in the Football League for Norwich City.

References 

1915 births
1992 deaths
Sportspeople from Cambridge
Association football fullbacks
English footballers
Cambridge City F.C. players
Brentford F.C. players
Norwich City F.C. players
English Football League players
Bury Town F.C. players